Broomtown is an unincorporated community and census-designated place in Cherokee County, Alabama, United States. As of the 2010 census, its population was 182. 

It was named for Chief Broom (Broomstown) of the Cherokee Nation, whose people occupied the area from the late eighteenth century into the 1830s. The Cherokee had migrated southwest under pressure from European-American encroachment in Tennessee and North Carolina, before Indian Removal from the Southeast on the Trail of Tears to Indian Territory west of the Mississippi River.

Fort Likens, a fort used to house soldiers during the Cherokee removal, was located near Broomtown.

References
	

Census-designated places in Alabama
Unincorporated communities in Alabama
Census-designated places in Cherokee County, Alabama
Unincorporated communities in Cherokee County, Alabama
Alabama placenames of Native American origin